The Kolomna constituency (No.119) is a Russian legislative constituency in Moscow Oblast. The constituency covers southeastern Moscow Oblast.

Members elected

Election results

1993

|-
! colspan=2 style="background-color:#E9E9E9;text-align:left;vertical-align:top;" |Candidate
! style="background-color:#E9E9E9;text-align:left;vertical-align:top;" |Party
! style="background-color:#E9E9E9;text-align:right;" |Votes
! style="background-color:#E9E9E9;text-align:right;" |%
|-
|style="background-color:"|
|align=left|Sergey Skorochkin
|align=left|Independent
|
|21.84%
|-
|style="background-color:"|
|align=left|Stanislav Zhebrovsky
|align=left|Liberal Democratic Party
| -
|14.40%
|-
| colspan="5" style="background-color:#E9E9E9;"|
|- style="font-weight:bold"
| colspan="3" style="text-align:left;" | Total
| 
| 100%
|-
| colspan="5" style="background-color:#E9E9E9;"|
|- style="font-weight:bold"
| colspan="4" |Source:
|
|}

1995 by-election

|-
! colspan=2 style="background-color:#E9E9E9;text-align:left;vertical-align:top;" |Candidate
! style="background-color:#E9E9E9;text-align:left;vertical-align:top;" |Party
! style="background-color:#E9E9E9;text-align:right;" |Votes
! style="background-color:#E9E9E9;text-align:right;" |%
|-
|style="background-color:"|
|align=left|German Titov
|align=left|Independent
|
|8.5%
|-
|style="background-color:"|
|align=left|Mikhail Guberman
|align=left|Independent
|
|7.3%
|-
|style="background-color:"|
|align=left|Yelena Mavrodi
|align=left|Independent
|
|5.08%
|-
|style="background-color:"|
|align=left|Stanislav Terekhov
|align=left|Independent
|
|4.43%
|-
|style="background-color:"|
|align=left|Aleksey Vedenkin
|align=left|Independent
| -
|<4%
|-
| colspan="5" style="background-color:#E9E9E9;"|
|- style="font-weight:bold"
| colspan="3" style="text-align:left;" | Total
| -
| 100%
|-
| colspan="5" style="background-color:#E9E9E9;"|
|- style="font-weight:bold"
| colspan="4" |Source:
|
|}

1995

|-
! colspan=2 style="background-color:#E9E9E9;text-align:left;vertical-align:top;" |Candidate
! style="background-color:#E9E9E9;text-align:left;vertical-align:top;" |Party
! style="background-color:#E9E9E9;text-align:right;" |Votes
! style="background-color:#E9E9E9;text-align:right;" |%
|-
|style="background-color:"|
|align=left|German Titov (incumbent)
|align=left|Communist Party
|
|31.79%
|-
|style="background-color:#F21A29"|
|align=left|Mikhail Guberman
|align=left|Trade Unions and Industrialists – Union of Labour
|
|11.00%
|-
|style="background-color:"|
|align=left|Oleg Kovalyov
|align=left|Our Home – Russia
|
|10.87%
|-
|style="background-color:"|
|align=left|Mikhail Perchenko
|align=left|Independent
|
|6.15%
|-
|style="background-color:"|
|align=left|Aleksandr Surkov
|align=left|Power to the People
|
|5.21%
|-
|style="background-color:"|
|align=left|Viktor Yenshin
|align=left|Liberal Democratic Party
|
|3.20%
|-
|style="background-color:"|
|align=left|Mikhail Galkin
|align=left|Kedr
|
|2.62%
|-
|style="background-color:"|
|align=left|Valery Podguzov
|align=left|Independent
|
|2.53%
|-
|style="background-color:#1C1A0D"|
|align=left|Raisa Baydikova
|align=left|Forward, Russia!
|
|2.29%
|-
|style="background-color:"|
|align=left|Svetlana Volkova
|align=left|Party of Tax Cuts' Supporters
|
|2.29%
|-
|style="background-color:#2C299A"|
|align=left|Yury Pankratov
|align=left|Congress of Russian Communities
|
|2.28%
|-
|style="background-color:#3C3E42"|
|align=left|Aleksandr Zotov
|align=left|Duma-96
|
|2.15%
|-
|style="background-color:#FE4801"|
|align=left|Nikolay Pankratov
|align=left|Pamfilova–Gurov–Lysenko
|
|2.11%
|-
|style="background-color:#C28314"|
|align=left|Aleksandr Razumov
|align=left|For the Motherland!
|
|2.01%
|-
|style="background-color:#019CDC"|
|align=left|Pavel Filippov
|align=left|Party of Russian Unity and Accord
|
|0.78%
|-
|style="background-color:"|
|align=left|Aleksandr Kukharenko
|align=left|Our Future
|
|0.60%
|-
|style="background-color:#0D0900"|
|align=left|Vladimir Konovalov
|align=left|People's Union
|
|0.34%
|-
|style="background-color:#000000"|
|colspan=2 |against all
|
|8.95%
|-
| colspan="5" style="background-color:#E9E9E9;"|
|- style="font-weight:bold"
| colspan="3" style="text-align:left;" | Total
| 
| 100%
|-
| colspan="5" style="background-color:#E9E9E9;"|
|- style="font-weight:bold"
| colspan="4" |Source:
|
|}

1999

|-
! colspan=2 style="background-color:#E9E9E9;text-align:left;vertical-align:top;" |Candidate
! style="background-color:#E9E9E9;text-align:left;vertical-align:top;" |Party
! style="background-color:#E9E9E9;text-align:right;" |Votes
! style="background-color:#E9E9E9;text-align:right;" |%
|-
|style="background-color:"|
|align=left|German Titov (incumbent)
|align=left|Communist Party
|
|20.32%
|-
|style="background-color:"|
|align=left|Gennady Gudkov
|align=left|Independent
|
|16.55%
|-
|style="background-color:#3B9EDF"|
|align=left|Vasily Semayev
|align=left|Fatherland – All Russia
|
|12.51%
|-
|style="background-color:"|
|align=left|Oleg Krasnykh
|align=left|Independent
|
|8.60%
|-
|style="background-color:"|
|align=left|Aleksey Zakharov
|align=left|Yabloko
|
|7.15%
|-
|style="background-color:#FF4400"|
|align=left|Natalya Yermakova
|align=left|Andrey Nikolayev and Svyatoslav Fyodorov Bloc
|
|5.76%
|-
|style="background-color:"|
|align=left|Vladimir Andreyev
|align=left|Independent
|
|5.00%
|-
|style="background-color:#004BBC"|
|align=left|Aleksandr Bazhenov
|align=left|Russian Cause
|
|2.47%
|-
|style="background-color:#E32322"|
|align=left|Aleksandr Kukharenko
|align=left|Stalin Bloc – For the USSR
|
|1.64%
|-
|style="background-color:"|
|align=left|Anatoly Saunin
|align=left|Independent
|
|1.39%
|-
|style="background-color:#084284"|
|align=left|Yury Needling
|align=left|Spiritual Heritage
|
|0.47%
|-
|style="background-color:#000000"|
|colspan=2 |against all
|
|14.96%
|-
| colspan="5" style="background-color:#E9E9E9;"|
|- style="font-weight:bold"
| colspan="3" style="text-align:left;" | Total
| 
| 100%
|-
| colspan="5" style="background-color:#E9E9E9;"|
|- style="font-weight:bold"
| colspan="4" |Source:
|
|}

2001

|-
! colspan=2 style="background-color:#E9E9E9;text-align:left;vertical-align:top;" |Candidate
! style="background-color:#E9E9E9;text-align:left;vertical-align:top;" |Party
! style="background-color:#E9E9E9;text-align:right;" |Votes
! style="background-color:#E9E9E9;text-align:right;" |%
|-
|style="background-color:"|
|align=left|Gennady Gudkov
|align=left|Independent
|
|43.96%
|-
|style="background-color:"|
|align=left|Viktor Anpilov
|align=left|Independent
|
|12.96%
|-
|style="background-color:"|
|align=left|Aleksandr Korolev
|align=left|Independent
|
|9.03%
|-
|style="background-color:"|
|align=left|Nina Veselova
|align=left|Independent
|
|6.09%
|-
|style="background-color:"|
|align=left|Yevgeny Loginov
|align=left|Independent
|
|3.92%
|-
|style="background-color:"|
|align=left|Igor Volk
|align=left|Independent
|
|3.72%
|-
|style="background-color:"|
|align=left|Stanislav Terekhov
|align=left|Independent
|
|2.90%
|-
|style="background-color:"|
|align=left|Tadeush Kasyanov
|align=left|Independent
|
|2.19%
|-
|style="background-color:"|
|align=left|Oleg Borodin
|align=left|Independent
|
|1.26%
|-
|style="background-color:"|
|align=left|Viktor Kuleshov
|align=left|Independent
|
|0.87%
|-
|style="background-color:#000000"|
|colspan=2 |against all
|
|10.89%
|-
| colspan="5" style="background-color:#E9E9E9;"|
|- style="font-weight:bold"
| colspan="3" style="text-align:left;" | Total
| 
| 100%
|-
| colspan="5" style="background-color:#E9E9E9;"|
|- style="font-weight:bold"
| colspan="4" |Source:
|
|}

2003

|-
! colspan=2 style="background-color:#E9E9E9;text-align:left;vertical-align:top;" |Candidate
! style="background-color:#E9E9E9;text-align:left;vertical-align:top;" |Party
! style="background-color:#E9E9E9;text-align:right;" |Votes
! style="background-color:#E9E9E9;text-align:right;" |%
|-
|style="background-color:#FFD700"|
|align=left|Gennady Gudkov (incumbent)
|align=left|People's Party
|
|46.97%
|-
|style="background-color:"|
|align=left|Vladimir Kashin
|align=left|Communist Party
|
|17.08%
|-
|style="background-color:"|
|align=left|Aleksandr Kukharenko
|align=left|Independent
|
|4.97%
|-
|style="background-color:"|
|align=left|Aleksandr Korolev
|align=left|Independent
|
|4.34%
|-
|style="background-color:"|
|align=left|Vladimir Kuleshov
|align=left|Liberal Democratic Party
|
|2.23%
|-
|style="background-color:#164C8C"|
|align=left|Elvira Kotova
|align=left|United Russian Party Rus'
|
|1.99%
|-
|style="background-color:"|
|align=left|Aleksey Vashchenko
|align=left|Independent
|
|1.87%
|-
|style="background-color:"|
|align=left|Aleksandr Artsibashev
|align=left|Agrarian Party
|
|1.47%
|-
|style="background-color:#000000"|
|colspan=2 |against all
|
|16.56%
|-
| colspan="5" style="background-color:#E9E9E9;"|
|- style="font-weight:bold"
| colspan="3" style="text-align:left;" | Total
| 
| 100%
|-
| colspan="5" style="background-color:#E9E9E9;"|
|- style="font-weight:bold"
| colspan="4" |Source:
|
|}

2016

|-
! colspan=2 style="background-color:#E9E9E9;text-align:left;vertical-align:top;" |Candidate
! style="background-color:#E9E9E9;text-align:left;vertical-align:top;" |Party
! style="background-color:#E9E9E9;text-align:right;" |Votes
! style="background-color:#E9E9E9;text-align:right;" |%
|-
|style="background-color: " |
|align=left|Yelena Serova
|align=left|United Russia
|
|47.96%
|-
|style="background-color:"|
|align=left|Vitaly Fedorov
|align=left|Communist Party
|
|12.23%
|-
|style="background-color:"|
|align=left|Yury Bezler
|align=left|Liberal Democratic Party
|
|11.18%
|-
|style="background-color:"|
|align=left|Semyon Bagdasarov
|align=left|A Just Russia
|
|9.55%
|-
|style="background:"| 
|align=left|Igor Chernyshov
|align=left|Communists of Russia
|
|4.47%
|-
|style="background-color:"|
|align=left|Dmitry Baranovsky
|align=left|The Greens
|
|3.75%
|-
|style="background-color:"|
|align=left|Sergey Karlov
|align=left|Party of Growth
|
|2.91%
|-
|style="background-color:"|
|align=left|Oleg Osipov
|align=left|Rodina
|
|2.28%
|-
| colspan="5" style="background-color:#E9E9E9;"|
|- style="font-weight:bold"
| colspan="3" style="text-align:left;" | Total
| 
| 100%
|-
| colspan="5" style="background-color:#E9E9E9;"|
|- style="font-weight:bold"
| colspan="4" |Source:
|
|}

2021

|-
! colspan=2 style="background-color:#E9E9E9;text-align:left;vertical-align:top;" |Candidate
! style="background-color:#E9E9E9;text-align:left;vertical-align:top;" |Party
! style="background-color:#E9E9E9;text-align:right;" |Votes
! style="background-color:#E9E9E9;text-align:right;" |%
|-
|style="background-color:"|
|align=left|Nikita Chaplin
|align=left|United Russia
|
|46.70%
|-
|style="background-color:"|
|align=left|Dmitry Kononenko
|align=left|Communist Party
|
|16.71%
|-
|style="background-color:"|
|align=left|Maria Semenova
|align=left|A Just Russia — For Truth
|
|7.04%
|-
|style="background-color: "|
|align=left|Aleksandr Kurguzov
|align=left|Party of Pensioners
|
|5.52%
|-
|style="background-color:"|
|align=left|Konstantin Musin
|align=left|Liberal Democratic Party
|
|5.42%
|-
|style="background-color: " |
|align=left|Ruslan Anchurov
|align=left|New People
|
|4.80%
|-
|style="background-color:"|
|align=left|Nadezhda Yelkina
|align=left|Party of Growth
|
|2.24%
|-
|style="background-color:"|
|align=left|Tatyana Filimonova
|align=left|Green Alternative
|
|1.88%
|-
|style="background: "| 
|align=left|Viktor Dulin
|align=left|Yabloko
|
|1.88%
|-
|style="background-color:"|
|align=left|Yevgeny Gvozdik
|align=left|The Greens
|
|1.60%
|-
|style="background-color:"|
|align=left|Aleksey Meshchersky
|align=left|Rodina
|
|1.17%
|-
| colspan="5" style="background-color:#E9E9E9;"|
|- style="font-weight:bold"
| colspan="3" style="text-align:left;" | Total
| 
| 100%
|-
| colspan="5" style="background-color:#E9E9E9;"|
|- style="font-weight:bold"
| colspan="4" |Source:
|
|}

Notes

References

Russian legislative constituencies
Politics of Moscow Oblast